= 2002 Barbarians end of season tour =

Summary
| P | W | D | L |
Total
| 3 | 2 | 0 | 1 |
Test match
| 3 | 2 | 0 | 1 |
Opponent
| P | W | D | L |
England XV
| 1 | 0 | 0 | 1 |
Wales XV
| 1 | 1 | 0 | 0 |
Scotland XV
| 1 | 1 | 0 | 0 |

The 2002 Barbarians end of season tour was a series of matches played in May–June 2002 in Scotland, Wales, England by Barbarian F.C.

== Results ==
26 May 2002

| England XV | 53–29 | Barbarians |

Twickenham Stadium, London

29 May 2002

| Wales XV | 25–40 | Barbarians |

Millennium Stadium, Cardiff

1 June 2002

| Scotland XV | 27–47 | Barbarians |

Murrayfield Stadium, Edinburgh
